Independent Township may refer to one of the following places in the United States:

 Independent Township, Barton County, Kansas
 Independent Township, Valley County, Nebraska

See also
 Independence Township (disambiguation)

Township name disambiguation pages